The United States Navy job rating of electronics technician (ET) is a designation given by the Bureau of Naval Personnel (BUPERS) to enlisted members who satisfactorily complete initial Electronics Technician "A" school training.

History of the Electronics Technician rating

WWII era
The Electronics Technician (abbreviated as ET) rating was originally established as Radio Technician (abbreviated as RT) in April 1942 during the height of World War II. The story of their training may be found at "Solving the Naval Radar Crisis" by Raymond C Watson, Jr. Trafford Publishing 2007 . 
The rating insignia adopted was that of the established Radioman (abbreviated as RM) rating, and remained until October 1945, when the rating name was changed to Electronic Technician's Mate (abbreviated as ETM). In 1948, the Navy changed the name of the rating to Electronics Technician, and a new rating insignia was created.

Vietnam era to present
In 1971 the Radarman (abbreviated as RD) rating was disestablished. Former Radarmen, depending on their training, were placed in to the either the established Electronic Technician (ET) rating or either of the newly established Operations Specialist (abbreviated as OS) or Electronic Warfare Technician (abbreviated as EW) ratings.

On 1 October 1998, the Data Systems Technicians (abbreviated as DS) rating was disestablished. Former Data Systems Technicians were, depending on their training, placed in to either the Electronics Technician or Fire Controlman (abbreviated as FC) rating.

Creation of the service ratings ET, ETR, ETV, and ETN

On 3 November 2015, a mostly administrative change was made to the general ET rating. 
 Electronics Technicians who volunteered for submarine duty were redesignated as either 
 Electronics Technician, Submarine, Communications (abbreviated as ETR) or 
 Electronics Technician, Submarine, Navigation (abbreviated as ETV). 
 Nuclear Power trained Electronics Technicians were redesignated as Electronics Technicians, Nuclear Power (abbreviated as ETN). 
 Electronics Technicians serving in the service rating Electronics Technician (ET) remained designed as Electronics Technician (ET). Electronics Technician (ET) is sometimes abbreviated as ETSW (Surface Warfare - communications, radar, and navigation) when it is necessary to distinguish ET from ETR (sub comm), ETV (sub navigation), and ETN (nuclear power).

All three new ratings as well as the original Electronics Technician rating use the same Electronics Technician rating insignia.

The reason for the change is because even though these four service ratings (ET, ETR, ETV, and ETN) fall under the same general rating (ET), share a common history, have similar names and share the same rating insignia; the enlistment requirements (e.g. submarine ratings are volunteer duty), initial 'A' school training, specialized 'C' school training, job assignments (billets), specific qualification, and community managers are unique to each of the four service rating. This prevents someone trained in any of the four service rating from easily transferring to another of the four service rating without first going through significant retraining and qualification that would be required by anyone transferring from any of the other general rating in the Navy.

There is prior usage to ETN and ETR.  At least through the 1970s, the "N" represented a Communications ET while the "R" represented a Radar ET.  This was usually determined by the ET "A" School curriculum taken by the student in later phases of training.  The "N" or "R" designation only applied to 3rd or 2nd class petty officers (paygrades E4 and E5).  1st class and chief petty officers (paygrades E6 through E9) did not have a "N" or "R" designation.

Elimination of all naval ratings
On 29 September 2016, the Navy moved away from traditional ratings to an alphanumeric system of Navy Occupational Specialty (NOS) codes. The ET-related NOS codes were: for ET, B420; for ETR, C126; for ETV, C121; for ETN, D110, D111, or D112.

On 21 December 2016, however, after months of widespread complaints, Chief of Naval Operations John Richardson released a message announcing a restoration of all U.S. Navy Ratings.

Electronics technician service ratings

Electronics technician (ET)

General description 

ETs are responsible for electronic equipment used to send and receive messages, computer information systems, long range radar, and calibration of test equipment. They maintain, repair, calibrate, tune, and adjust electronic equipment used for communications, detection and tracking, recognition and identification, navigation.

Working environment 

Jobs performed by ETs are performed throughout the Navy's fleet of surface ships including aircraft carriers and Aegis cruisers and destroyers, and at communication activities and repair activities ashore.

Minimum requirements 

ASVAB: MK + EI + GS = 156 + AR = 223
Must have normal color perception
Must have normal hearing
Security clearance required
Must be a U.S. Citizen

Employment and subspecialties 

Entry rates ET3-ET2 (E4-E5) specialize as electronics communications technician, electronics data systems technician, or electronics radar systems technician.  ET1-ETC (E6-E7) are electronics systems managers.

Electronics Communications Technicians 

Maintain shore-based, ship-based, portable communications equipment, and portable Mechatronic equipment, including all associated cabling, computer, multiplexing, motor, switching, cryptographic, recording, cooling water and dry air systems; analyze equipment operation and align, troubleshoot using digital multimeters, oscilloscopes, thermal couples and repair equipment to the lowest replaceable unit; execute casualty control procedures, restoring operability for all assigned electronic equipment, recognizing mission criticality and redundancies within systems; perform administrative functions that include the updating of casualty reporting messages, technical manuals, equipment maintenance records, and managing test equipment calibration requirements;Motors and motor controls for satellite antennas, radar cooling motor control pumps mechanical knowledge of electrical motor characteristics brush and brushless, complete fiber optic and basic soldering repair, electrical safety checks, and test equipment calibration; and supervise personnel who complete maintenance, conduct tool, MAM, and test equipment inventories, logistics support, and operational verification testing of new systems or equipment.

Electronics Data Systems Technicians 
Maintain data link, inertial navigation, tactical network, message routing, digital production/projection, calibration, fiber optics, micro-miniature module test and repair, computer-based, and peripheral computer systems; analyze equipment operation, establish computer and network configurations, and troubleshoot and repair computer-based equipment to the lowest replaceable unit; execute casualty control procedures, restoring operability for all assigned electronic equipment, recognizing mission criticality and redundancies within systems; perform administrative functions that include the updating of casualty reporting messages, technical manuals, equipment maintenance records, and  managing test equipment calibration requirements; complete fiber optic and basic soldering repair, electrical safety checks, and test equipment calibration; and supervise personnel who complete maintenance, conduct tool, MAM, and test equipment inventories, logistics support, and operational verification testing of new systems or equipment.

Electronics Radar Systems Technicians 
Maintain surface search, air search, and weather radar systems, radar video switchboards, synchros, Identification Friend or Foe (IFF) equipment, tactical air navigation equipment, including all associated cabling, cooling water and dry air systems; analyze equipment operation and align, troubleshoot, and repair equipment to the lowest replaceable unit; execute casualty control procedures, restoring operability for all assigned electronic equipment, recognizing mission criticality and redundancies within systems; perform administrative functions that include managing test equipment calibration requirements and the updating of casualty reporting messages, technical manuals, and equipment maintenance records; complete, fiber optic and basic soldering repair, electrical safety checks, and test equipment calibration; and supervise personnel who complete maintenance, conduct tool, MAM, and test equipment inventories, logistics support, and operational verification testing of new systems or equipment.

Required training 

Enlistees are taught the fundamentals of the ET rating through the following formal Navy schooling.

After "A" school, ETs continue on to advanced "C" schools. School lengths and content vary, but many colleges and universities offer college credits for these Navy courses.

Electronics Technician Navy Enlisted Classifications 
The Navy Enlisted Classification (NEC) system supports the enlisted rating structure in identifying personnel and billets in manpower authorizations. NEC codes identify a non-rating wide skill, knowledge, aptitude, or qualification that must be documented to identify both people and billets for management purposes.  The most current information regarding NECs can be found in the Navy NEOCS Manual.

After 'A' school and between duty assignments ETs will attend advanced 'C' school training. These 'C' school give the ET advanced training in the specific systems that will be required to maintain and repair at their next duty assignment.

There are 62 ET-related NECs.

The follow NEC list is incomplete:

Submarines: Electronics Technician Communications (ETR) and Electronics Technician Navigation (ETV)

General description 

The Navy's Submarine Electronics / Computer Field (SECF) offers extensive training in the operation and maintenance of "Today's High Technology" advanced electronics equipment, digital systems and computers used in submarine combat control, sonar, navigation and communications systems.  An individual selecting SECF will receive training in electricity, electronics, computers, digital systems, fiber optics and electronics repair.
The standards for selection for enlistment in the Navy's Submarine Electronics/ Computer Field are high.  Personnel interested in applying for the Submarine Electronics/ Computer Field should be seriously interested in pursuing the challenge this highly technical field offers.  They must be mature, ready to take on significant responsibility and willing to apply themselves.

What they do 

Volunteers for the Submarine Electronics/Computer Field will specialize in one of four Submarine Ratings (Electronics Technician – Communications (ETR), Electronics Technician – Navigation (ETV), Fire Control Technician (FT), and Sonar Technician Submarines (STS) working in one of four areas: combat systems, communications, navigation or underwater acoustic technologies.  All four ratings/specialty areas are heavily involved with computer and electronics systems. The communications specialty (ETR) is responsible for all operational and administrative aspects of the submarine's radio communication equipment, systems and programs.  The navigation specialty (ETV) is responsible for all operational and administrative aspects of the submarine's navigation and radar equipment, systems and programs.

Minimum requirements 
ASVAB: AR + MK + EI + GS = 222 or VE + AR + MK + MC = 222
Must have normal color perception
Must have normal hearing
Top Secret Security Clearance
Must be U.S. Citizen
Must volunteer for submarine duty
Must have no record of conviction by civil court for any offense other than minor traffic
Moral turpitude offenses are generally disqualifying
No history of drug abuse.

Required training 
Submarine ETs (navigation and communications) must complete Basic Enlisted Submarine School, ATT, Tactical Computer and Network Operator, and "A" School at Naval Submarine School in Groton, CT.

Electronics Technician Communication (ETR)

Electronics Technician Communication Naval Enlisted Classifications

Electronics Technician Navigation (ETV)

Electronics Technician Navigation Naval Enlisted Classifications

Electronics Technician Nuclear Power (ETN) 

Nuclear-trained ETNs perform duties in nuclear propulsion plants primarily in operating, maintaining, and repairing reactor instrumentation and control systems. ETNs may be assigned as an operator to a nuclear-powered aircraft carrier, as an instructor at a Navy nuclear power training command, or as a technician at a shipyard or other nuclear support facility.  Additionally ETNs may volunteer for nuclear submarine service.  ETNs are the only rating in the Navy that can qualify as a reactor operator of a naval nuclear propulsion plant.

Training 

ETNs complete several different phases of training in order to be able to operate a naval nuclear propulsion plant.  In order to be selected for nuclear training prospective Navy recruits must have a high enough cutscore on the Armed Service Vocational Battery (ASVAB) that score being greater than 88 and the Navy Advanced Placement Test (NAPT) that score being greater than 55%.  Prospective nuclear recruits are then sent to Navy boot camp where prospective nuclear trainees are selected in a 50-30-20 ratio to be trained as nuclear machinist's mates, nuclear electrician's mate, or nuclear electronics technicians.  Those who are selected to be nuclear electronics technicians then enter the Navy Nuclear Pipeline to train to become an ETN.

In the first stage of training in the Navy Nuclear Pipeline, prospective ETNs are trained for six months at the Nuclear Field 'A' School (NFAS) at the Naval Nuclear Power Training Command (NNPTC) in Goose Creek, SC.  The curriculum at NFAS includes a mathematics refresher course, basic electronics theory, analog electronics theory (EFUNDS), digital electronics theory, and instrumentation and control equipment (I&CE) theory and maintenance.  The curriculum is presented in a high paced manner that ramps up over the term at NFAS in order to prepare students for the difficulties of Nuclear Power School.  The curriculum is very similar to that which is presented to nuclear electricians except that nuclear electricians train in electrical motor and generator theory and maintenance instead of I&CE theory and maintenance.  Due to the specialized training given at NFAS, ETNs who have trained there instead of another ET 'A' school are not qualified to be assigned to billets designed for non-nuclear ETs. Personnel who are disqualified from Navy nuclear work ('de-nuked') or who fail to qualify for Navy nuclear work later in the pipeline are reclassified and retrained into another rating in order to remain in the Navy. ETN is not eligible for direct conversion to ET. This means that for an ETN to become and ET they must attend the ET 'A' school.

In the second stage of training in the Navy Nuclear Pipeline, ETNs are trained for six months at the Nuclear Power School at the NNPTC.  The curriculum for ETNs at the Nuclear Power School includes a higher level mathematics (Calculus) refresher course, introduction to nuclear propulsion systems, Navy nuclear mechanical, electrical, and electronics system design, reactor theory, health physics, basic materials science, and chemistry as it applies to nuclear power plants.  The curriculum is similar for MMNs, EMNs, and ETNs, except that each rating focuses more on their particular nuclear system design (for nuclear ETNs this means that they have additional training in nuclear electronics design).

In the third and final stage of training in the Navy Nuclear Pipeline, ETNs are trained for six months at one of four Navy nuclear prototype training units (NPTUs).  Three NPTUs are moored training ships (MTS) using a S5W reactor and two S6G reactors located at the Naval Weapons Station in Charleston, SC., and two additional NPTUs are land-based prototype units using a S7G reactor and a S8G reactor located in Saratoga Springs, NY.  The curriculum for ETNs at an NPTU includes detailed health physics training, design, operation, and maintenance of electronics systems for the NPTU, nuclear watchstanding procedures, and nuclear casualty procedures.  Unlike the first two stages of the Navy Nuclear Pipeline where the curriculum is presented in a typical classroom format, training at an NPTU is self-motivated training where students are required to research different aspects of a nuclear propulsion plant design, operation, or theory and demonstrate this knowledge in an oral interview with a qualified nuclear instructor.  Additionally, ETNs must perform graded watches under the instruction of a qualified nuclear instructor where they operate a particular piece of nuclear equipment or respond to a casualty.  The culmination of training for an ETN is an oral board where an ETN must demonstrate the knowledge of all procedures, equipment, theory expected for a nuclear reactor operator.  Completion of NPTU qualifies an ETN to stand watch on the NPTU or to train to operate nuclear propulsion plants on a nuclear aircraft carrier or submarine.  Additionally, it gives the individual the ETN Navy Enlisted Classification (NEC), and the individual is then said to be "nuclear qualified."

Upon completion of the Naval Nuclear Pipeline, most nuclear qualified ETNs are sent to nuclear aircraft carriers or nuclear submarines.  On a nuclear-powered aircraft carrier, ETNs are sent to a nuclear training division where they train to qualify to operate the nuclear reactors of the ship in a similar way to NPTU for about six months prior to being sent to a reactor control division.  In contrast, on a submarine ETNs are directly assigned to the Reactor Controls division and are directed to qualify different watches incrementally.  Due to the smaller number of personnel on a nuclear submarine, ETNs must also cross qualify on several nuclear electrician watches.  Since ETNs are required to stand watches, perform maintenance, and train and qualify on additional submarine systems, it is not uncommon for it to take over 12 months for an ETN to become fully qualified as a reactor operator, shutdown reactor operator, and all intermediate watches.  Upon subsequent transfer to an NPTU or another nuclear ship, operators are required to re-qualify the same watches in only about 6 months.

Even upon completion of being fully qualified on all ETN watches ("qualified in rate"), additional proficiency and casualty training is required for all ETNs.  On a ship this generally includes general Engineering or Reactor Department training, Reactor Controls division training, periodic exams and interviews, monitored maintenance and operations, periodic watch re-qualifications, and monitored tactical or casualty drills.

Usually after an ETN is "fully qualified" the individual is sent to an "in-rate" technical school ETMS where the technician studies electronic troubleshooting and repair on shipboard equipment.  Completion of this school allows the technician to be designated with the NEC 3373.

Senior ETNs (typically those who hold the rank of petty officer first class (E-6) or higher) are expected to qualify for senior supervisory watches.  Self-motivated training for this includes the detailed operations of all nuclear systems on a ship (not just the ETN specific parts) focusing on the big picture view of nuclear operations and casualty response.  The training time required to qualify for senior supervisory watches depends on the individual.

See also
 List of United States Navy ratings

References

United States Navy ratings
Military supporting service occupations